James Paul Lankford (born March 4, 1968) is an American politician serving as the senior United States senator from Oklahoma, a seat he has held since 2015.

From 1996 to 2009, Lankford was the student ministries and evangelism specialist for the Baptist General Convention of Oklahoma and director of the youth programming at the Falls Creek Baptist Conference Center in Davis, Oklahoma.

In January 2014, Lankford announced he would run in the 2014 U.S. Senate special election following Tom Coburn's planned resignation from the Senate. He won the June 2014 primary with 57% of the vote, becoming the Republican nominee. He won the special election with nearly 68% of the vote and was elected to the balance of Coburn's term. He was reelected in 2016, again with nearly 68% of the vote, and in 2022, with 64% of the vote. He became the senior senator in 2023 after Senator Jim Inhofe retired.

Early life, education and career 
Lankford was born March 4, 1968, in Dallas, Texas, the son of Linda Joyce (née House) and James Wesley Lankford. His mother was an elementary school librarian. His maternal grandparents owned a small dry-cleaning business, his father and paternal grandparents a dairy farm. His stepfather was a career employee of AC Delco, the parts division of General Motors.

His parents divorced when he was four; he lived with his mother and older brother for a time in his grandparents' garage apartment. He became a Christian at eight. His mother remarried when he was twelve, and the family moved to Garland, Texas, with his stepfather.

Lankford attended Lakeview Centennial High School in Garland. While there, he participated in the Close Up Washington civic education program. He earned a Bachelor of Science degree in Secondary Education (specializing in speech and history) at University of Texas at Austin in 1990, and a master's degree in Divinity at Southwestern Baptist Theological Seminary in 1994. He was a substitute teacher and speech team assistant teacher at Pflugerville High School in 1991.

After graduating, Lankford moved to Edmond, a suburb of Oklahoma City, where he still lives. He worked for the Baptist General Convention of Oklahoma. From 1996 to 2005, he was the program director of Falls Creek, the largest Christian camp in the U.S.

U.S. House of Representatives

Elections

2010 

After two-term incumbent Republican Mary Fallin announced she was giving up her seat to run for governor of Oklahoma, Lankford entered the race to succeed her. He finished first in a seven-way Republican primary—the important contest in this heavily Republican district—and defeated former State Representative Kevin Calvey in the runoff. He then defeated Democrat Billy Coyle in the general election with 62.53% of the vote.

2012 

Lankford defeated Democrat Tom Guild with 59% of the vote. Following the election, he was named chairman of the House Republican Policy Committee, the fifth-ranking position in the House Republican caucus, an unusually senior position for a second-term House member.

Committee assignments
 United States House Committee on the Budget
 United States House Committee on Oversight and Government Reform
 United States House Oversight Subcommittee on Energy Policy, Health Care and Entitlements (Chairman)
 United States House of Representatives Republican Policy Committee (Chair)

U.S. Senate

Elections

2014 

In January 2014, Lankford announced he would run in the 2014 Senate special election to succeed retiring Republican Senator Tom Coburn. Lankford won the June 2014 Republican primary, defeating former state House speaker T.W. Shannon and former state senator Randy Brogdon. In November, Lankford won the election for the final two years of Coburn's second term, defeating retiring state senator Constance N. Johnson by 319,079 votes, with 557,002 (67.9%) to Johnson's 237,923 (29.0%). Independent candidate Mark Beard won the remaining 25,965 votes (3.2%).

2016 

Lankford was elected to a full six-year term in the Senate in 2016, defeating Democratic consultant Mike Workman with 67.7 percent of the vote. As in 2014, he won in a landslide, carrying every county in the state.

2022 

On April 6, Lankford announced he would seek reelection. He was reelected with 64% of the vote.

Tenure 
Lankford was sworn into office on January 6, 2015, by Vice President Joe Biden.

On December 21, 2017, Lankford was one of six senators to introduce the Secure Elections Act, legislation authorizing block grants to states to update outdated voting technology as well as form a program for an independent panel of experts that would work toward the development of cybersecurity guidelines for election systems that states could then implement, along with offering states resources to install the recommendations.

Committee assignments
 Committee on Appropriations
 Subcommittee on Commerce, Justice, Science, and Related Agencies
 Subcommittee on Energy and Water Development
 Subcommittee on Financial Services and General Government
 Subcommittee on Labor, Health and Human Services, Education, and Related Agencies
 Subcommittee on State, Foreign Operations, and Related Programs
 Committee on Finance
 Subcommittee on Fiscal Responsibility and Economic Growth
 Subcommittee on Health Care
 Subcommittee on Social Security, Pensions, and Family Policy
 Committee on Homeland Security and Governmental Affairs
 Subcommittee on Regulatory Affairs and Federal Management (Chairman)
 Committee on Indian Affairs
 Select Committee on Ethics

Political positions

Taxes 
Lankford supports budget austerity through lowering taxes and reducing government spending. He took the taxpayer protection pledge promising to support no new taxes. He supports the repeal of the income and estate taxes and supports a sales tax to tax consumption and not savings or earnings.

Guns 
In 2014, Lankford was endorsed by the National Rifle Association and had an "A" rating from the group. Lankford supports loosening restrictions on interstate gun purchases. He opposes firearm microstamping, a controversial method of imprinting casings with a unique marking to match it with a specific firearm, and would allow veterans to register unlicensed firearms.

After the 2018 Stoneman Douglas High School shooting in which the perpetrator used a Smith & Wesson M&P15 AR-15 style rifle to kill 17 and wound 17 others, Lankford said on NBC News' Meet the Press he was open to requiring more comprehensive background checks for firearm purchases, saying, "The problem is not owning an AR-15, it’s the person who owns it.”

Cannabis
Lankford opposed a 2018 ballot measure to legalize medical marijuana in Oklahoma, calling it "harmful to the social fabric of Oklahoma" and arguing that it would have a "dramatic effect on our families and our schools and our businesses and the future of our state". He also appeared in a video ad calling for defeat of the initiative, stating: "Our families won't be better if more parents and grandparents smoke more marijuana." The measure passed with 57% of the vote.

In 2015, Lankford introduced the Keeping out Illegal Drugs (KIDS) Act to block federal funds for Indian tribes that allow the cultivation or distribution of marijuana on their land. Lankford stated: "It is important for our nation to help address this issue for the sake of the next generation of Native Americans. This legislation is a good step in trying to protect young tribal members and fulfill our trust responsibility to Native Americans."

Defense 
Lankford supports extending the Patriot Act and expanding roving wiretaps occurring in the US. He supports the prioritization of security, starting with military bases.

Environment 
Lankford supports expanding exploration of gas and oil both domestically and on the outer continental shelf. He opposes the Environmental Protection Agency regulating emission standards as he believes it hinders economic growth. Lankford believes manure and other fertilizers should not be classified as pollutants or hazardous.

Lankford rejects the scientific consensus on climate change, calling it a "myth." In 2018, he strongly criticized the National Science Foundation for funding projects that seek to increase reporting on climate change in weathercasts, saying it "is not science—it is propagandizing."

Healthcare 
Lankford opposes the Affordable Care Act and has voted to repeal it. In a 2017 Facebook post, he claimed "Since 2013, a majority of states are seeing premiums and costs double, including states that expanded Medicaid".

Lankford has stated his belief that federally funded health insurance is unconstitutional and that he will oppose any and all moves for a federal healthcare system. He supported an initiative to allow Medicare choice and institute budget cuts.

Abortion 
Lankford opposes abortion. He believes Congress should recognize life at the moment of fertilization. He opposes any federally funded programs that allow for abortion, as well as Planned Parenthood and other similar groups.

LGBT rights 
Lankford opposes same-sex marriage. In the early days of his 2010 campaign for the House of Representatives, Lankford disparaged the Matthew Shepard and James Byrd Jr. Hate Crimes Prevention Act, which expanded hate crime legislation to include greater penalties for hate crimes motivated by the victim's sexual orientation or race.

Lankford supported Oklahoma Question 711, a statewide constitutional ban on same-sex marriage and civil unions that passed in 2004 with 75% of the vote and remained law until it was challenged in court and struck down by a federal judge as unconstitutional in 2014. Lankford lambasted the decision, saying that "marriage is a state issue and Oklahoma has spoken." He also endorsed the Defense of Marriage Act and condemned the 2013 Supreme Court decision striking down parts of the law.

Lankford has defended businesses and individuals opposing LGBT rights, including Chick-fil-A in the wake of its denunciation over donations to groups opposing same-sex marriage, and Phil Robertson after he was suspended from Duck Dynasty in 2013 following comments regarded as anti-LGBT and racist. Lankford attacked A&E for suspending Robertson, writing that Robertson "should be able to speak his views without fear of being silenced."

In 2012, five days after President Barack Obama announced his support for same-sex marriage, the first sitting U.S. president to do so, Lankford told a ThinkProgress interviewer that he believed homosexuality is a choice and that employers should be allowed to terminate workers for their sexual orientation: "I think it's a choice issue." After LGBT advocates condemned his statements, Lankford defended himself on local television, reiterating his view that homosexuality is a choice.

After the Southern Poverty Law Center designated the Alliance Defending Freedom an anti-LGBT hate group, Lankford criticized the designation and defended the ADF, which had described same-sex marriage as a threat to "healthy, free and stable society."

In 2015, Lankford condemned the Supreme Court ruling in Obergefell v. Hodges, which held that same-sex marriage bans violated the constitution.

Xinjiang 
In August 2018, Lankford, Marco Rubio and 15 other lawmakers urged the Trump administration to impose sanctions under the Global Magnitsky Act against Chinese officials responsible for human rights abuses in western China's Xinjiang region. They wrote: "The detention of as many as a million or more Uyghurs and other predominantly Muslim ethnic minorities in "political reeducation” centers or camps requires a tough, targeted, and global response."

Race relations 
In June 2020, Lankford criticized President Trump's decision to walk to the St John's Episcopal Church near the White House, calling it "confrontational". In a BBC interview he said that racism passes on from one generation to the next, and he challenged families to invite a family of a different ethnicity to their home for a meal, to "allow friendship to develop where there has only been friendliness in the past".

In January 2021, after Lankford questioned the validity of the 2020 presidential election, some Black Tulsa leaders called for him to resign from both the 1921 Race Massacre Centennial Committee and the Senate. They saw the false fraud allegations, which focused on primarily Black cities, as an attack on Black voters. Lankford later apologized for his role in casting doubt on Black votes.

2020 election 
After Joe Biden won the 2020 presidential election and Trump refused to concede, Lankford said he would intervene and ensure that Biden, the incoming president, would receive intelligence briefings. Shortly thereafter, he backtracked, said the media had twisted his words, and said "I'm not in a hurry, necessarily, to get Joe Biden these briefings."

Lankford initially announced plans to object to the counting of some swing states' electoral votes as part of an attempt to overturn the 2020 United States presidential election, but he reversed course after the 2021 United States Capitol attack. He later apologized to his black constituents for his involvement in casting doubt on votes from predominantly black communities in several swing states.

Lankford voted to acquit in the second impeachment trial of Donald Trump.

On May 28, 2021, Lankford voted against creating the January 6 commission.

Earmarks 
In 2021, Lankford opposed bringing back earmarks to the Senate.

Personal life 
Lankford and his wife, Cindy, have two daughters. He attends Quail Springs Baptist Church, a Southern Baptist church in Oklahoma City.

Electoral history

Oklahoma's 5th congressional district election, 2010

Oklahoma's 5th congressional district election, 2012

U.S. Senate special election in Oklahoma, 2014

U.S. Senate election in Oklahoma, 2016

U.S. Senate election in Oklahoma, 2022

References

External links 
 U.S. Senator James Lankford official U.S. Senate website
 James Lankford for U.S. Senate
 
 
 

|-

|-

|-

|-

|-

1968 births
21st-century American politicians
Living people
Politicians from Dallas
People from Edmond, Oklahoma
Republican Party members of the United States House of Representatives from Oklahoma
Republican Party United States senators from Oklahoma
Southern Baptists
Southwestern Baptist Theological Seminary alumni
University of Texas at Austin College of Education alumni
Baptists from Oklahoma